Richard Bookstaber (born 1950) is the author of A Demon Of Our Own Design, a book highlighting the fragility of the financial system that occurs from tight coupling and complexity.  The book is noted for its foreshadowing of the financial crisis of 2007–08.  He is also the author of The End of Theory, which critiques the applicability of economics in dealing with financial crises, and proposes an alternative paradigm using agent-based models.

Academic career 
Bookstaber received a B.A. in Economics from Brigham Young University and a Ph.D. from the Massachusetts Institute of Technology.

He held academic positions at Boston University, Brigham Young University, and the Hebrew University of Jerusalem, the last as a Fulbright Scholar.  His research focused on option pricing theory, and he wrote an early book in the field.

He has also authored scores of articles on finance topics ranging from option theory to risk management.

Industry career 
Bookstaber joined Morgan Stanley in 1984, where he held positions in research and proprietary trading, and was appointed to be the firm's first market risk manager.  
In 1994 he moved to Salomon Brothers where he was the Managing Director in charge of firmwide risk.  
Following the purchase of Salomon Brothers by Citigroup he took on risk manager roles in a number of hedge funds, including Moore Capital Management and Bridgewater Associates; and also founded the FrontPoint Partners Quantitative Equities Fund.
He also worked at Ziff Brothers Investments doing both risk management and running a quantitative equity portfolio.

Bookstaber is the co-founder and head of risk at Fabric, which provides risk management applications for the wealth management and asset owner community.

Public sector career 
Following the publication of A Demon Of Our Own Design, Bookstaber testified a number of times to Congress on issues related to the financial crisis on topics including derivatives, hedge funds, systemic risk, and risk management.

Beginning in 2009 he took on various number of roles in the U.S. financial regulatory system. Bookstaber worked at the U.S. Securities and Exchange Commission during formulation of the Volcker Rule.

From 2010-2013 he worked at the United States Department of the Treasury as a Senior Policy Advisory to the Financial Stability Oversight Council, and Research Principal at the Office of Financial Research.  His research focused on applying agent-based models to assess systemic financial vulnerabilities.

He subsequently served as the Chief Risk Officer in University of California's Office of the CIO, overseeing its $180 billion investment portfolio.

Notes 

1950 births
Living people
Financial economists
Financial risk management
American financial writers
Brigham Young University alumni
Massachusetts Institute of Technology alumni